is a Japanese professional baseball pitcher for the Hanshin Tigers of Nippon Professional Baseball (NPB).

Early baseball career
Born in Nara Prefecture, Hiroya started playing baseball in 1st grade for the Yamatotakada Eagles (little league), then for the Kashihara Condor Boys when he was in junior high.

During his sophomore year in Fukuchiyama Seibi High School, his team placed runner-up in the autumn Kyoto Tournament, and won against baseball powerhouse PL Gakuen High School during the Kinki Tournament, where he pitched a complete game (1 earned-run, 10 strikeouts). In his junior year however, due to the involvement of his teammates in a scandal, their team was banned from participating in games. They also didn't make it to Kōshien tournaments.

Professional career
In October 28, 2010, Hanshin Tigers selected Shimamoto with the second selection in the 2010 NPB draft. In November 12, he signed with the Tigers for an estimated 3 million yen annual salary. He was assigned the jersey number 126.。

He appeared in a handful of Western League (farm) games in his first two years. In 2013, he was able to pitch as a reliever in 25 farm games, but the opposing batters seemed to get the best of him and he finished with an ERA of 4.94. Because he was unable to make it to the main roster for three years, he was released from his contract on October 31, and was offered to sign a 1-year Ikusei (development) contract on November 12.

His appearances in farm games increased in 2014, and upon release from his Ikusei contract, he was again offered a regular contract on November 21.

On December 2, 2020, he become a free agent. On December 8, 2020, Shimamoto re-signed with the Tigers.

Playing Style
With a lean build listed at 176 centimeters, Shimamoto is a southpaw pitcher whose fastballs are clocked at a maximum of 144 km/h. While he can also deliver sliders and forkballs, he learned the shuuto from pitching coach Yutaka Ohno during the 2014 spring camp. He was also deemed to possess excellent ball control.

References

External links
NPB stats
 

1993 births
Living people
Baseball people from Nara Prefecture
Hanshin Tigers players
Japanese baseball players
Nippon Professional Baseball pitchers